Eric R. Fossum (born October 17, 1957) is an American physicist and engineer known for co-developing the CMOS image sensor. He is currently a professor at Thayer School of Engineering in Dartmouth College.

Early years and education 
Fossum was born and raised in Simsbury, Connecticut and attended public school there.  He also spent Saturdays at the Talcott Mountain Science Center in Avon, CT, which he credits for his lifelong interest in science, engineering and mentoring students. He received his B.S. in engineering from Trinity College in 1979, and his  Ph.D. in electrical engineering from Yale University in 1984.

Academic career 
Eric R. Fossum was a member of the Electrical Engineering faculty at Columbia University from 1984 to 1990. At Columbia University, he and his students performed research on CCD focal-plane image processing and high speed III-V CCDs. In 1990, Dr. Fossum joined the NASA Jet Propulsion Laboratory, California Institute of Technology and managed JPL’s image sensor and focal-plane technology research and advanced development.

In 2007 he sponsored, in part, the Trinity College Fire-Fighting Robot Contest, aimed at increasing innovation and invention in the world of robotics.

He joined the Thayer School of Engineering at Dartmouth in 2010 where he teaches, performs research on the Quanta Image Sensor with his graduate students, and coordinates the  Ph.D. Innovation Program. He also serves as Vice Provost for Entrepreneurship and Technology Transfer.

Invention
While Fossum was at NASA's Jet Propulsion Laboratory (JPL), then-NASA Administrator Daniel Goldin invoked a plan of "Faster, Better, Cheaper" for NASA Space Science missions.  One of the instrument goals was to miniaturize charge-coupled device (CCD) camera systems onboard interplanetary spacecraft. In response, throughout the early 1990s, Fossum, Sunetra Mendis and Sabrina E Kemeny, developed a new CMOS active-pixel sensor (APS) with intra-pixel charge transfer camera-on-a-chip technology.

He developed a CMOS sensor with his team at JPL in 1993. The same year, he published an extensive paper broadly defining the active-pixel sensor (APS) and giving a historical overview of the technology [reference needed]. He largely credits the invention of APS technology to the Japanese companies Olympus and Toshiba during the mid-to-late 1980s, noting the former developed the vertical APS structure with NMOS transistors and the latter developed the lateral APS structure with PMOS transistors. His team at JPL were the first to fabricate a practical APS outside of Japan, while making several key improvements to APS technology. The JPL sensor used a lateral APS structure similar to the Toshiba sensor, but was fabricated with CMOS (complementary metal-oxide-semiconductor) transistors rather than PMOS transistors. This made JPL's APS device the first CMOS sensor with intra-pixel charge transfer.

In 1994, Fossum proposed an improvement to the CMOS sensor: the integration of the pinned photodiode (PPD). A CMOS sensor with PPD technology was first fabricated in 1995 by a joint JPL and Kodak team that included Fossum along with P.P.K. Lee, R.C. Gee, R.M. Guidash and T.H. Lee. Further refinements to the CMOS sensor with PPD technology between 1997 and 2003 led to CMOS sensors achieve imaging performance on par with CCD sensors, and later exceeding CCD sensors.

As part of Goldin's directive to transfer space technology to the public sector whenever possible, Fossum led the CMOS APS development and subsequent transfer of the technology to US industry, including Eastman Kodak, AT&T Bell Labs, National Semiconductor and others. Despite initial skepticism by entrenched CCD manufacturers, the CMOS image sensor technology is now used in almost all cell-phone cameras, many medical applications such as capsule endoscopy and dental x-ray systems, scientific imaging, automotive safety systems, DSLR digital cameras and many other applications. Over 6 billion cameras are manufactured each year using CMOS technology.

Entrepreneur
In 1995, frustrated by the slow pace of the technology's adoption, he and then-wife Dr. Sabrina Kemeny co-founded Photobit Corporation to commercialize the technology.  He joined as Chairman of the Board and Chief Scientist in 1996 and became CEO of Photobit Technology Corporation in 2000. In late 2001, Micron Technology Inc. acquired Photobit and Dr. Fossum was named a Senior Micron Fellow. He left Micron in 2003. In 2005, he joined SiWave Inc., a developer of MEMS technology for mobile phone handsets, as CEO.  SiWave was renamed Siimpel and grew substantially before his departure in 2007.  Siimpel was later acquired by Tessera for $15M.

In 1986 he founded the IEEE Workshop on CCDs, now known as the International Image Sensor Workshop (IISW).  He co-founded and was the first President of the International Image Sensor Society 
(IISS) which operates the IISW.

Achievements and awards 

Eric R. Fossum has published over 300 technical papers, and holds more than 170 U.S. patents. He is a Fellow member of the IEEE. He has been primary thesis adviser to a number of graduated Ph.D.s.
He has received several prizes and honors including:

 Yale’s Becton Prize in 1984.
 IBM Faculty Development Award in 1984.
 National Science Foundation Presidential Young Investigator Award in 1986, the JPL Lew Allen Award for Excellence in 1992.
 NASA Exceptional Achievement Medal in 1996.
 Induction into the US Space Foundation Space Technology Hall of Fame in 1999.
 Photographic Society of America Progress Medal in 2003.
 Royal Photographic Society Progress Medal in 2004.
 IEEE Andrew S. Grove Award in 2009.
 Inventor of the Year by the New York Intellectual Property Law Association in 2010.
 Induction into the National Inventors Hall of Fame in 2011.
 Elected as a Charter Fellow of the National Academy of Inventors in 2012.
 Elected as a Member of the National Academy of Engineering in 2013.
 Received the Doctor of Science honoris causa from Trinity College (Connecticut) in 2014.
 Received 2017 Queen Elizabeth Prize for Engineering (shared with 3 people)
 OSA/IS&T Edwin H. Land Medal in 2020.
 National Academy of Television Arts and Sciences Technology and Engineering Emmy Award in 2020

References

External links 
 Profile of Eric R. Fossum
 Eric R. Fossum at Dartmouth
 personal site

Yale School of Engineering & Applied Science alumni
Columbia University faculty
1957 births
Living people
Dartmouth College faculty
Trinity College (Connecticut) alumni
Date of birth missing (living people)
American electrical engineers
Electrical engineering academics